Beta-keratin (β-keratin) is a member of a structural protein family found in the epidermis of reptiles and birds. Beta-keratins were named so because they are components of epidermal stratum corneum rich in stacked beta sheets, in contrast to alpha-keratins, intermediate-filament proteins also found in stratum corneum and rich in alpha helices. Because the accurate use of the term keratin is limited to the alpha-keratins, the term "beta-keratins" in recent works is replaced by "corneous beta-proteins" or "keratin-associated beta-proteins." 

β-keratins add much more rigidity to reptilian skin than alpha-keratins alone do to mammalian skin. β-keratins are impregnated into the stratum corneum of the reptilian skin, providing waterproofing and the prevention of desiccation.

The scales, beaks, claws and feathers of birds contain β-keratin of the avian family.  Phylogenetic studies of β-keratin sequences show that feather β-keratins evolved from scale β-keratins.  The scale β-keratins form the basal group in avians.  Duplication and divergence events then led to claw β-keratin genes, and further recombination resulted in new feather and feather-like avian β-keratin genes.  Evidence for these duplication events comes from the correlation of feather β-keratin clade structure with their genomic loci.

Changes in β-keratins may have also influenced the development of powered flight.  A recent study using molecular dating methods to link the evolution of avian β-keratin genes in general to that of feathers specifically reveals that the avian β-keratin family began diverging from the crocodile family about 216 million years ago.  It also found that the feather β-keratin family did not begin diverging until 125 million years ago, a date consistent with the adaptive radiation of birds during the Cretaceous.  β-keratins found in modern feathers have increased elasticity, a factor that may have contributed to their role in flight.  Thus, feathered relatives of birds such as  Anchiornis and Archaeopteryx, whose flight capabilities have been questioned, would have had avian, but not feather, β-keratins.

The small alvarezsaurid dinosaur Shuvuuia deserti shows evidence of a featherlike skin covering.  Analysis by Schweitzer et al. (1999) showed that these featherlike structures consisted of beta-keratin. This has since been refuted by Saitta et al., finding that the fibers analyzed instead consisted of inorganic calcium phosphate as evidenced by fluorescence under cross polarised light. Signals from immunohistochemical analyses on fossil samples are prone to false positives and must be used with caution when dealing with geological samples.

References

External links
 

There are two main forms of keratin, alpha-keratin and beta-keratin. Alpha-keratin is seen in humans and other mammals, beta-keratin is present in birds and reptiles. Beta-keratin is harder than alpha-keratin. Structurally alpha-keratin have alpha-helical coiled coil structure while beta-keratin have twisted beta sheet structure.bIn the case of β-sheets, this allows sterically-unhindered hydrogen bonding between the amino and carboxyl groups of peptide bonds on adjacent protein chains, facilitating their close alignment and strong binding. Fibrous keratin molecules can twist around each other to form helical intermediate filaments.

The secondary structure of silk is an example of the beta pleated sheet. In this structure, individual protein chains are aligned side-by-side with every other protein chain aligned in an opposite direction. The chains are antiparallel, with an alternating C → N orientation. The protein chains are held together by intermolecular hydrogen bonding, that is hydrogen bonding between amide groups of two separate chains. This intermolecular hydrogen bonding in the beta-pleated sheet is in contrast to the intramolecular hydrogen bonding in the alpha-helix.

The hydrogen on the amide of one protein chain is hydrogen bonded to the amide oxygen of the neighboring protein chain. The pleated sheet effect arises form the fact that the amide structure is planar while the "bends" occur at the carbon containing the side chain.

The "side" chain R groups in silk are not very bulky. The basic primary structure of silk consists of a six amino acid unit that repeats itself. The sequence where every other unit is glycine in silk is: -gly-ala-gly-ala-gly-ala-. Although glycine and alanine make up 75-80% of the amino acids in silk, another 10-15% is serine and the final 10% contain bulky side chains such as in tyr, arg, val, asp, and glu.

Keratins